The National Parliament of Solomon Islands has 50 members, elected for a four-year term in 50 single-seat constituencies.

It is presided by a Speaker, currently Patterson Oti.

Latest elections

Members
The official website of the National Parliament of Solomon Islands maintains a list of current members of parliament, with biographical indications, categorised by name, constituency and party.

See:
 8th Parliament of Solomon Islands (2006–2010)
 9th Parliament of Solomon Islands (2010–2014)
 10th Parliament of Solomon Islands (2014–2019)
 1976 Solomon Islands general election
 1980 Solomon Islands general election
 1984 Solomon Islands general election
 1989 Solomon Islands general election
 1993 Solomon Islands general election
 1997 Solomon Islands general election
 2001 Solomon Islands general election
 2006 Solomon Islands general election
 2010 Solomon Islands general election
 2014 Solomon Islands general election
 2019 Solomon Islands general election

See also
Legislative Council of the Solomon Islands
Governing Council of the Solomon Islands

References

External links
 

Solomon Islands
Politics of the Solomon Islands
Government of the Solomon Islands
Solomon Islands
Solomon Islands